Papia may refer to :

 Pavia, city in northern Italy
 Pupiana, Italia curiate name of a Latin Catholic titular bishopric in Africa proconsularis
 Papia gens, an ancient Roman family